{{DISPLAYTITLE:C9H6O4}}
The molecular formula C9H6O4 (molar mass: 178.14 g/mol, exact mass 178.026609 u) may refer to:

 Aesculetin, a coumarin
 Ninhydrin (2,2-dihydroxyindane-1,3-dione)

Molecular formulas